is a railway station on the Amagi Line located in Chikuzen, Fukuoka, Japan. It is operated by the Amagi Railway, a third sector public-private partnership corporation.

Lines

Platforms

Adjacent stations

History
On 1 April 1986, control of the station was handed over to the Amagi Railway.

Surrounding area 
 Kirin Brewery Fukuoka Factory
 Tachiarai Peace Memorial Museum
 Community Center
 Daiichi Seiko Fukuoka Plant
 Lawson store
 FamilyMart
 West Japan City Bank
 Japan National Route 500

References

Railway stations in Fukuoka Prefecture
Railway stations in Japan opened in 1939